Paul Fitzsimons is a former Gaelic footballer who played for the Cavan county team.

County career
Paul Fitzsimons lined out at corner forward in the 1952 victorious final. he played in the drawn game and was introduced as sub for John Joe Cassidy in the replay and went on to score 1pt. Cavan went on to celebrate a 0–9 to 0–5 win.

References

Year of birth missing (living people)
Living people
Cavan inter-county Gaelic footballers